Chiang Mai International School (CMIS;) is a K-12 International school founded in 1954 in Chiang Mai, Thailand by members of the Church of Christ in Thailand. The school is approved by the Thai Ministry of Education and is accredited by the Western Association of Schools and Colleges.

CMIS is an independent, co-educational, non-profit day school offering an English-language education.

An article by lifestyle magazine Chiang Mai CityLife states the school's “enrollment is highly competitive and based on a student’s overall grades, their level of English communication and their performance on the mandatory standardized tests.”

History 
After World War II, Thailand became a hub for Christian missionaries working in Asia. Unable to find schools for their children, missionaries started their own school in Chiang Mai, known as "Chiang Mai Children's Center" (CMCC) in 1945. CMCC also served as a boarding school, providing children of missionaries a place to live when their parents are away. 

A 2010 independent panel investigation by the Presbyterian Church revealed that female students were sexually abused by ministers who served as houseparents at the school.

The school received legal status in 1984 and became "Chiang Mai International School." In the following years, the school added more grade levels and expanded to include high school.

References

External links
Chiang Mai International School Homepage 

International schools in Chiang Mai
Educational institutions established in 1954
1954 establishments in Thailand
Private schools in Thailand